East Capitol Street is a major street that divides the northeast and southeast quadrants of Washington, D.C. It runs due east from the United States Capitol to the DC-Maryland border. The street is uninterrupted until Lincoln Park then continues eastward to Robert F. Kennedy Memorial Stadium.  East of the stadium, East Capitol crosses the Anacostia River over the Whitney Young Memorial Bridge and then goes underneath Route 295 before crossing into Prince George's County, Maryland where it becomes Maryland State Highway 214.

The western stretch of East Capitol Street, which passes through the heart of Washington's Capitol Hill neighborhood, includes some of the priciest real estate in the city.  East Capitol Street is home to the Folger Shakespeare Library.

Capitol Hill
Streets in Washington, D.C.